June 2012

See also

References 

 06
June 2012 events in the United States